Nolan Bertrandoff Miller (January 8, 1933 – June 7, 2012) was an American fashion and jewelry designer on QVC and a television costume designer best known for his work on the long-running 1980s series Dynasty, its spin-off series The Colbys and the 1991 miniseries Dynasty: The Reunion. He collaborated on many projects with television producers Aaron Spelling and Douglas S. Cramer, including Charlie's Angels, The Love Boat, Fantasy Island, Hotel, Hart to Hart, and Vega$.

Early life
 Nolan later stated, "When I was about in the 5th or the 6th grade I made up my mind I fell in love with movies and I thought I want to design gorgeous costumes for gorgeous stars and it was my lifelong ambition. I never wanted anything else. I never changed". He worked in the oil fields of Texas and Louisiana after high school. His family moved at least twice before settling in San Bernardino, California. He studied design at the Chouinard Art Institute, now the California Institute of the Arts. Unable to find work in the entertainment industry, he worked in a florist shop in Beverly Hills, where he met Aaron Spelling, who hired Miller to design clothes for the film, thus initiating Miller's career creating fashion for the stars.

Career
From 1983 to 1987, Miller was nominated six times for an Emmy Award. Nominated four times for Dynasty, he won a 1984 Primetime Emmy Award for Outstanding Costumes for a Series for the soap opera, which also set a fashion trend for strong-shouldered dresses and power suits. He was also nominated in 1985 for the Elizabeth Taylor television movie Malice in Wonderland, and in 1987 for The Two Mrs. Grenvilles, starring Ann-Margret and Claudette Colbert.

Christopher Schemering notes in The Soap Opera Encyclopedia that "[t]he Nolan Miller creations became so popular that Dynasty spawned its own line of women's apparel", and later a men's fashion line. "The Dynasty Collection," was a series of fashion designs based on costumes worn by Joan Collins, Linda Evans, Stephanie Beacham and Diahann Carroll. Miller maintained a career as a private couturier in Beverly Hills, California, with clients including Sophia Loren, Elizabeth Taylor and Joan Collins. For two decades he designed a line of jewelry for QVC. A 2005 collaboration with Joan Rivers and Kenneth Jay Lane, the Scoundrel Collection, was designed for the Broadway production of the musical Dirty Rotten Scoundrels. The collection was presented on QVC with a April 25, 2005 broadcast and sold at the Imperial Theatre's concessionaire.

Death
Nolan had battled lung cancer for several years. He announced his retirement on July 4, 2011 on QVC. Friend and actress Joan Collins broke the news that Miller had died in his sleep in Woodland Hills, California on June 6, 2012; he was 79 years old. He was predeceased by his ex-wife, Sandra Stream Miller, who died in November 2011; they had no children.

Selected credits
These Old Broads (2001) (TV)
Titans (2000–01) (TV)
Sunset Beach (1997) (TV) (jewelry designing and furnishing)
Pacific Palisades (1997) (TV)
Models Inc (1994–95) (TV)
Dynasty: The Reunion (1991) (TV)
Soapdish (1991)
Peter Gunn (1958) (TV)
Skin Deep (1989)
Malice in Wonderland (1985) (TV)
Hollywood Wives (1985) (TV miniseries)
The Colbys (1985-1987) (TV)
Making of a Male Model (1983) (TV)
Hotel (1983–88) (TV)
Don't Go to Sleep (1982) (TV)
Bare Essence (1982) (TV)
Paper Dolls (1982) (TV)
T.J. Hooker (1982–86) (TV)
Matt Houston (1982–1985) (TV)
Dynasty (1981–89) (TV)
Honey West (1965) (TV)
Hart to Hart (1979–84) (TV)
Charlie's Angels (1976–81) (TV)
Folies Bergere at The Tropicana Hotel Las Vegas (1975) (Vegas Revue)

References

External links
 
 
 

1933 births
2012 deaths
American costume designers
Deaths from lung cancer in California
People from Wichita County, Texas
People from San Bernardino, California
QVC people